The China Paper Cutting Museum (Chinese: 中国剪纸博物馆) is a museum located in Yangzhou, China. The museum is dedicated to preserving paper art from China.

History 
The idea with the creation of this museum was originated by the Chairman of the Chinese Folk Literature and Art Association Feng Yica, with the purpose of preserving the paper cutting art of China.: In April 2007, the museum was inaugurated. Since 2016, the museum has been part of the Google Arts & Culture platform. In 2017, the first paper cutting bineal in Yangzhou was organized in the museum, the bineal is about different paper cutting techniques including works by Xiong Chongrong and Pang Jiandong. In 2020, the museum received 27 pieces of paper cutting art from different artists including Li Liefeng.

Collections 
The museum contains artifacts donated by the Chinese Folk Literature and Art Association, including objects from different periods of Chinese history. The museum contains cultural objects in addition to objects decoratively covered with lacquer. The museum contains paper-cut works by Zhang Xiufang and Zhang Muli, in addition the museum contains lamps decorated with paper cuts. In 2016, the museum organized an exhibition with works by Hsing Yun. The museum also houses works by Zhao Hongmei and Zhang Yongshou. The museum is divided into four sections

 Exhibition on the history of paper cutting in China
 Main studio on paper cutting
 Training center on the art of paper cutting
 Sales center

References

External links 
Google Arts & Culture reports about the China Paper Cutting Museum:

 The Paper-cuts of Zhang Xiufang
 The Art of Cutting Paper with Zhang Muli
 Have Your Mind Blown by the Beauty of Cut-Paper Paintings
 Discover Yangzhou's Charming Cut-Paper Art

Museums in Jiangsu
Buildings and structures in Yangzhou
2007 establishments in China
Paper art